Musa Dattijo Muhammad  (born 27 October 1953) is a Nigerian jurist and Justice of the Supreme Court of Nigeria.

Early life
Musa Dattijo was born on 27 October 1953 at Chanchaga, a local government area in Minna, the capital of Niger State, North-Central Nigeria.
He attended Authority Primary School, Minna and Sardauna memorial secondary school where he obtained the West Africa School Certificate in 1971.
He attended Bayero University in Kano State Northern Nigeria for a pre-degree Certificate before he proceeded to Ahmadu Bello University where he received a Bachelor of Law degree in 1976.
He later received a master's degree in law from University of Warwick in 1983.

Law career
In July 2012, he was appointed to the bench of the Supreme Court of Nigeria as Justice.
He presided over the ruling of the Supreme Court that affirmed Gbenga Kaka as the senator-elect of Ogun East Senatorial District  in the 2 April 2011 senatorial  election.

Awards
In October 2022, a Nigerian national honour of Commander of the Order of the Federal Republic (CFR) was conferred on him by President Muhammadu Buhari.

Membership
Member, Nigerian Bar Association
Member, International Bar Association
Member, Nigerian Body of Benchers

References

Nigerian jurists
Living people
1953 births
Bayero University Kano alumni
Ahmadu Bello University alumni
Alumni of the University of Warwick
Supreme Court of Nigeria justices